Phaenomenella is a genus of sea snails, marine gastropod mollusks in the subfamily Siphonaliinae of the family Buccinidae, the true whelks.

Species
According to the World Register of Marine Species (WoRMS), the following species with valid names are included within the genus Phaenomenella :

 Phaenomenella angusta Hadorn & Fraussen, 2006
 Phaenomenella callophorella (Fraussen, 2003)
 Phaenomenella cirsiumoides (Fraussen, 2004)
 Phaenomenella inflata (Shikama, 1971)
 Phaenomenella insulapratasensis (Okutani & Lan, 1994)
 Phaenomenella mokenorum Fraussen, 2008
 Phaenomenella nicoi Kantor, Kosyan, Sorokin & Fedosov, 2020
 Phaenomenella samadiae Kantor, Kosyan, Sorokin & Fedosov, 2020
 Phaenomenella thachi Fraussen & Stahlschmidt, 2012
 Phaenomenella venusta Fraussen & Stahlschmidt, 2012
 Phaenomenella vexabilis Fraussen & Stahlschmidt, 2013

References

 Fraussen K. & Stahlschmidt P. (2013) The extensive Indo-Pacific radiation of Phaenomenella Fraussen & Hadorn, 2006 (Gastropoda: Buccinidae) with description of a new species. Novapex 14(4): 81–86.

External links
  Fraussen K. & Hadorn R. 2006. Phaenomenella, a new genus of deep-water buccinid (Gastropoda: Buccinidae) with the description of a new species from Taiwan. Novapex 7(4): 103-109
 Kantor Y.I., Kosyan A., Sorokin P. & Fedosov A. (2020). On the taxonomic position of Phaenomenella Fraussen & Hadorn, 2006 (Neogastropoda, Buccinoidea) with description of two new species. Zoosystema. 42(3): 33-55

Buccinidae